Three ships of the Royal Navy were named HMS Tay.

 , a 20-gun post-ship wrecked in 1816
 , iron screw gunboat of three 54-pounder guns launched 1876 by Palmer, Jarrow; Sold 1920 to Stanlee, Dover.

See also

References
 

Royal Navy ship names